Sphingomonas melonis  is a bacterium from the genus of Sphingomonas which has been isolated from the plant Cucumis melo var. inodorus in Madrid in Spain. Sphingomonas melonis can cause brown spots on melon fruits from the melon plant (Cucumis melo var. inodorus). In rice plants it can have disease-preventing effects, the seed-endophytic strain Sphingomonas melonis ZJ26 that can be naturally enriched in certain rice cultivars, confers diseases resistance against a bacterial pathogen and is vertically transmitted among plant generations via their seeds.

References

Further reading

External links
Type strain of Sphingomonas melonis at BacDive -  the Bacterial Diversity Metadatabase

melonis
Bacteria described in 2002